Charles Wilkins Webber (May 29, 1819 – April 11, 1856) was a United States journalist and explorer.

Biography
Webber was born at Russellville, Kentucky.  He was the son of Augustine Webber, a well-known physician in Kentucky. His mother, who was the daughter of Gen. John Tannehill, passed on to him a fondness for outdoor life. In 1838, Webber went to Texas, then struggling for independence; was for several years connected with the famous Texas Rangers, seeing much of wild and adventurous life on the frontier; returned to Kentucky and studied medicine; afterward entered Princeton Theological Seminary with a view to the Presbyterian ministry, but abandoned that purpose, and settled in New York as a writer for literary periodicals, especially The New World, The Democratic Review, and The Sunday Despatch; was associate editor and joint proprietor of The Whig Review; planned, with the two sons of his friend John James Audubon the naturalist, a monthly magazine of mammoth size, to be illustrated with copper-plate colored engravings by Audubon, but published only the first number; was engaged in an unsuccessful attempt to lead an exploring and mining expedition to the region of the Colorado and Gila rivers in 1849.  A principal reason for the failure of the expedition to the west was the seizure of the horses by Comanche Indians.

The difficulty in crossing the western deserts led to his efforts to form a camel company, for which he obtained a charter from the New York legislature in 1854. In 1855 he went to Central America, where he joined the filibuster William Walker in Nicaragua and was killed in a skirmish.

Works
In addition to his contributions to periodicals, he authored Old Hicks the Guide, or Adventures in the Comanche Country in Search of a Gold-Mine (New York, 1848); The Gold-Mines of the Gila (1849); The Hunter Naturalist, a Romance of Sporting (Philadelphia, 1851), with 40 engravings from original drawings by Mrs. Webber; Wild Scenes and Song-Birds (New York, 1854), with 20 colored illustrations from drawings by Mrs. Webber; Tales of the Southern Border (part i, 1852; complete, 1853); Spiritual Vampirism (1853); Jack Long; or The Shot in the Eye (a Gothic Western highly praised by Edgar Allan Poe); Adventures with the Texan Rifle Rangers (London, 1853); History of Mystery (Philadelphia, 1855); and other works.

References

External links
 

This article incorporates text from the Universal Cyclopædia & Atlas, 1902, New York, D. Appleton & Co., a publication now in the public domain.

1819 births
1856 deaths
People from Russellville, Kentucky
Gila River
19th-century American journalists
American male journalists
19th-century American male writers